Queen of Songs is a studio album by Filipino singer-actress Nora Aunor released in 1972 by Alpha Records Corporation in the Philippines in LP format and later released in 1999 in a compilation/ cd format. it contains 12 tracks consisting of mainly cover versions of Connie Francis (Everybody's Somebody's Fool and Who's Sorry Now), Carole King (Sweet Seasons)and Petula Clark (You and I and Love Me With All Your Heart). She also ventured into singing foreign language tunes in Spanish (Lo Siento Mucho) and in Japanese (Here's My Happiness). The latter was originally sung by Teddy Tanaka and covered also famously by Nora Aunor's sometime singing partner Eddie Peregrina. The Irving Berlin penned Sayonara from the 1957 film of the same name, while Japanese in theme, is fully in English. On the other hand, Love Me With All Your Heart,  was originally a Spanish song, Cuando calienta el sol. The same can be said of The Wedding which was originally a Spanish tune named La Novia (the Bride).

The extended version of Nora Aunor's famous Coca-Cola commercial, I'd Like To Teach The World To Sing is also included here.

Track listing

Side one

Side two

Album credits 
Musical Arranger

 Doming Valdez

Recording Supervisor

 Gil Cruz

Recorded At
 CAI Studios

Original Cover Design
 Rudy Retanan

See also
 Nora Aunor discography

References 

Nora Aunor albums
1971 albums